Stig Fredrik Strömholm (born 16 September 1931 in Boden, Sweden), Swedish, former rector magnificus of Uppsala University and past president of Academia Europaea.

Strömholm received his education in Uppsala (B.A. 1952; LL.B. 1957, Licentiate 1957). He completed a doctorate in Law in Uppsala in 1966. He was Professor in Jurisprudence in Uppsala from 1969, and Professor in Private Law and Conflict of Laws there 1982–1997. After an appointment as prorector (deputy vice-chancellor) of Uppsala University 1978–1989, he was rector magnificus (vice-chancellor) of the university 1989–1997. On 5 June 1992 Strömholm received an honorary doctorate from the Faculty of Humanities at Uppsala University, Sweden.

On his retirement from the rectorial chair in 1997, he received a festschrift, Festskrift till Stig Strömholm (Uppsala 1997), in two volumes and 925 pages, including a partial bibliography.

Strömholm was awarded the Illis quorum by the Swedish government in 1997. He holds the Gunnerus Medal. He was elected foreign member of the Finnish Society of Sciences and Letters in 1981 and an honorary member of the Society in 1988. In 1990 he was awarded the title of Foreign Academician of Science of the Academy of Finland. Strömholm is also a foreign member of the Norwegian Academy of Science and Letters. Strömholm was elected member of Academia Europaea in 1989; he served as its president from 1997 to 2002.

References

 Stig Strömholm, detailed curriculum vitae

1931 births
Living people
People from Boden Municipality
Swedish jurists
Legal writers
20th-century Swedish novelists
Writers from Norrbotten
20th-century Swedish historians
Recipients of the Pour le Mérite (civil class)
Rectors of Uppsala University
Ludwig Maximilian University of Munich alumni
Alumni of the University of Cambridge
Members of Academia Europaea
Members of the Norwegian Academy of Science and Letters
Recipients of the Order of the Cross of Terra Mariana, 2nd Class
Swedish male novelists
Uppsala University alumni
Recipients of the Illis quorum
Members of the Royal Gustavus Adolphus Academy
Members of the Royal Swedish Academy of Sciences
Members of the Royal Swedish Academy of Letters, History and Antiquities